Pain Necessary to Know is the third studio album by the Italian avant-garde metal band Ephel Duath.  The album was observed to be another departure for the band, with Ciaran Tracey noting in Terrorizer that "its sheer difference in the hugely tangential path Ephel Duath have taken from everything done hitherto, even in terms of their own varied and colourful palette".  Tracey further observed that the band's previous "multiple personality disorder seems to have been replaced by a bipolar schizophrenia, with the numerous faces of past work having been cast aside in favour of two basic protagonists: explosive rage and light jazz".

Cosmo Lee similarly remarked in Stylus Magazine that

Reception

Ciaran Tracey commented in Terrorizer that the album was "at times wholly random in its obtuse jazz meandering and violently extreme ejaculations" yet it "perfectly conjures the fug, the smell and the bleeding of saturated colour into black sky that makes our nocturnal city lives the unsavoury and sometimes downright dangerous places they are".

Track listing

 "New Disorder" – 5:01
 "Vector (Third Movement)" – 4:15
 "Pleonasm" – 2:31
 "Few Stars, No Refrain And A Cigarette" – 3:43
 "Crystalline Whirl" – 4:51
 "I Killed Rebecca" – 5:23
 "Vector" – 4:17
 "Vector (Second Movement)" – 3:02
 "Imploding" – 5:10

Personnel

 Luciano Lorusso George — Vocals
 Fabio Fecchio — Bass
 Davide Tiso — Guitars and spare time instruments
 Riccardo Pasini — Synths and manipulations
 Davide Piovesan - Drums

References

Ephel Duath (band) albums
Earache Records albums
2005 albums